Four ships of the Royal Navy and Commonwealth of England navy have borne the name James:

  was a balinger acquired in 1417 and given away in 1422.
  was a 48-gun ship launched in 1634.  She was renamed Old James in 1660 and was sold in 1682.
  was a 30-gun ship, previously the Royalist Exchange.  She was captured by the Parliamentarians in 1649 and listed until 1650.
  was a hoy captured from the Dutch in 1665, but recaptured in 1673.

See also
 
 
 
 

Royal Navy ship names